Audrey Powers is the vice president of mission and flight operations of American aerospace and spaceflight company Blue Origin. On October 13, 2021, Powers accompanied William Shatner along with two other space tourists on a New Shepard rocket as part of the Blue Origin NS-18 mission into space.

References 

Year of birth missing (living people)
Living people
Place of birth missing (living people)
American women business executives
Blue Origin people
People who have flown in suborbital spaceflight
21st-century American businesspeople
21st-century American businesswomen
New Shepard passengers
space tourists